John Koopman (June 15, 1879 – September 16, 1949) was an American painter. His work was part of the painting event in the art competition at the 1932 Summer Olympics.

References

1879 births
1949 deaths
20th-century American painters
American male painters
Olympic competitors in art competitions
People from Missaukee County, Michigan
20th-century American male artists